The economy of the Central African Republic is $2.321 billion by gross domestic product as of 2019, with an estimated annual per capita income of just $805 as measured by purchasing power parity in 2019.

Sparsely populated and landlocked, the Central African Republic is overwhelmingly agrarian. The vast bulk of the population engages in subsistence farming and 55% of the country's GDP derives from agriculture. Subsistence agriculture, together with forestry, remains the backbone of the economy of the Central African Republic (CAR), with more than 70% of the population living in outlying areas.

Principal food crops include cassava, peanuts, sorghum, millet, maize, sesame, and plantains. Principal cash crops for export include cotton, coffee, and tobacco. Timber has accounted for about 16% of export earnings and the diamond industry for nearly 54%. Central African Republic is a least developed country according to United Nations.

Infrastructure 

Much of the country's limited electrical supply is provided by hydroelectric plants located in Boali. Fuel supplies must be barged in via the Oubangui River or trucked overland through Cameroon, resulting in frequent shortages of gasoline, diesel, and jet fuel. The C.A.R.'s transportation and communication network is limited. The country has only 429 kilometers of paved road, limited international, and no domestic air service, and does not possess a railroad.

River traffic on the Oubangui River is impossible from April to July, and conflict in the region has sometimes prevented shipments from moving between Kinshasa and Bangui. The telephone system functions, albeit imperfectly. Four radio stations operate in the C.A.R., as well as one television station. Numerous newspapers and pamphlets are published on a regular basis, and one company provides Internet access.

Forestry 

In 2014, the country exported 59.3 million US dollars of forest products. This accounts for 40% of total export earnings in the C.A.R.

Natural resources 
The country has rich natural resources in the form of diamonds, gold, uranium, and other minerals. Diamonds constitute one of the most important exports of the CAR, frequently accounting for 20-30% of export revenues, but an estimated 30-50% of the diamonds produced each year leave the country clandestinely. There may be petroleum deposits along the country's northern border with Chad. (Two billion barrels of oil are present in private estimates).

Diamonds are the only of these mineral resources currently being developed; reported sales of largely uncut diamonds made up close to 60% of the CAR's export earnings as of 2001. Industry contributes less than 20% of the country's GDP, with artesian diamond mining, breweries, and sawmills making up the bulk of the sector. Services account for 25% of GDP, largely because of government bureaucracy and high transportation costs arising from the country's landlocked position.

Agriculture 

74% (2013) of the population in the Central African Republic works in the agriculture industry, so Central African Republic's economy is dominated by the cultivation and sale of foodcrops such as yams, cassava, peanuts, maize, sorghum, millet, sesame, and plantains. The importance of foodcrops over exported cash crops is illustrated by the fact that the total production of cassava, the staple food of most Central Africans, ranges between c. 200,000 and 300,000 tons a year, while the production of cotton, the principal exported cash crop, ranges from c. 25,000 to 45,000 tons a year.

Foodcrops are not exported in large quantities but they still constitute the principal cash crops of the country because Central Africans derive far more income from the periodic sale of surplus foodcrops than from exported cash crops such as cotton or coffee. Many rural and urban women also transform some foodcrops into alcoholic drinks such as sorghum beer or hard liquor and derive considerable income from the sale of these drinks. Much of the income derived from the sale of foods and alcohol is not "on the books" and thus is not considered in calculating per capita income, which is one reason why official figures for per capita income are not accurate in the case of the CAR.

The per capita income of the CAR is often listed as being around $400 a year, said to be one of the lowest in the world, but this figure is based mostly on reported sales of exports and largely ignores the more important but unregistered sale of foods, locally produced alcohol, diamonds, ivory, bushmeat, and traditional medicines, for example. The informal economy of the CAR is more important than the formal economy for most Central Africans.

Central African Republic produced in 2019:

 730 thousand tons of cassava;
 511 thousand tons of yam (7th largest producer in the world);
 143 thousand tons of peanut;
 140 thousand tons of taro;
 138 thousand tons of banana;
 120 thousand tons of sugar cane;
 90 thousand tons of maize;
 87 thousand tons of plantain;
 75 thousand tons of vegetable;
 36 thousand tons of orange;
 30 thousand tons of sorghum;
 21 thousand tons of cotton;
 19 thousand tons of pumpkin;
 17 thousand tons of pineapple;
 12 thousand tons of mango;
 10 thousand tons of millet;
 10 thousand tons of coffee;
 8.5 thousand tons of avocado;
 6.7 thousand tons of sesame seed;

In addition to smaller productions of other agricultural products.

Finance and banking 
The financial sector of the CAR, the smallest in the CEMAC, plays a limited role in supporting economic growth. Suffering from weak market infrastructure and legal and judicial frameworks, the financial system remains small, undeveloped, and dominated by commercial banks. Because of economic and security concerns, financial institutions, and particularly microfinance institutions (MFIs), have consolidated their business in the capital, Bangui, over the past few years.

With less than 1% of the total population holding a bank account, access to financial services is extremely limited in the CAR. Microfinance accounts only for 1% of the total credit facilities, serving 0.5 percent of the population. Low levels of mobile penetration – which stand at 30%, a significantly lower percentage than in the rest of the continent – dampen the potential expansion of access to financial services through mobile technology. In April 2022, the country announced that it will adopt the cryptocurrency bitcoin as legal tender.

Economic aid and development 

The CAR is heavily dependent upon multilateral foreign aid and the presence of numerous NGO's which provide numerous services which the government fails to provide. As one UNDP official put it, the CAR is a country "sous serum," or a country hooked up to an IV (Mehler 2005:150). The presence of numerous foreign personnel and organizations in the country, including peacekeepers and refugee camps, provides an important source of revenue for many Central Africans.

In the 40 years since independence, the CAR has made slow progress toward economic development. Economic mismanagement, poor infrastructure, a limited tax base, scarce private investment, and adverse external conditions have led to deficits in both its budget and external trade. Its debt burden is considerable, and the country has seen a decline in per capita gross national product over the last 40 years.

Important constraints to economic development include the CAR's landlocked position, a poor transportation system, a largely unskilled work force, and a legacy of misdirected macroeconomic policies. The 50% devaluation of the currencies of 14 Francophone African nations on 12 January 1994 had mixed effects on the CAR's economy. Diamond, timber, coffee, and cotton exports increased, leading an estimated rise of GDP of 7% in 1994 and nearly 5% in 1995.

Military rebellions and social unrest in 1996 were accompanied by widespread destruction of property and a drop in GDP of 2%. Ongoing violence between the government and rebel military groups over pay issues, living conditions, and political representation has destroyed many businesses in the capital and reduced tax revenues for the government.

The International Monetary Fund (IMF) approved an Extended Structure Adjustment Facility in 1998. The government has set targets of annual 5% growth and 25% inflation for 2000–2001. Structural adjustment programs with the World Bank and IMF and interest-free credits to support investments in the agriculture, livestock, and transportation sectors have had limited impact. The World Bank and IMF are now encouraging the government to concentrate exclusively on implementing much-needed economic reforms to jump-start the economy and defining its fundamental priorities with the aim of alleviating poverty. As a result, many of the state-owned business entities have been privatized and limited efforts have been made to standardize and simplify labor and investment codes and to address problems of corruption. The Central African Government is currently in the process of adopting new labor and investment codes.

Macroeconomic
The following table shows the main economic indicators in 1980–2017.

Exchange rates

See also 
 Central African Republic
 Economy of Africa
 Mining industry of the Central African Republic
 United Nations Economic Commission for Africa

References

Notes

External links 
 

 
Central African Republic
Central African Republic